Paul Martin Postal (born November 10, 1936 in Weehawken, New Jersey) is an American linguist.

Biography
Postal received his PhD from Yale University in 1963 and taught at MIT until 1965. That year, he moved to the City University of New York. In 1967 he was appointed to a research position at IBM and he remained on their research staff until 1994. 

An important figure in the early development of generative grammar, he became a proponent of the generative semantics movement along with George Lakoff, James D. McCawley, and Haj Ross. In the 1970s, with David M. Perlmutter, he developed Relational Grammar. Later, with David E. Johnson, he developed Arc Pair Grammar. These non-transformational theories of grammar have had an indirect but major impact on modern syntactic analysis.

Since his involvement with generative semantics, he has been a vocal critic of Noam Chomsky and work done in Chomsky's frameworks.

Selected bibliography

Postal, Paul M. (1968). Aspects of phonological theory. New York: Harper & Row.  
Postal, Paul M. (1972). "The best theory". In S. Peters (Ed.), Goals of linguistic theory. Englewood Cliffs, NJ: Prentice-Hall.  
Postal, Paul M. (1974) On Raising: One Rule of English Grammar and Its Theoretical Implications. Cambridge: MIT Press. 
Johnson, David E.; & Postal, Paul M. (1980). Arc pair grammar. Princeton: Princeton University Press.  
Culicover, P. W., & Postal, Paul M. (2000). Parasitic gaps. Cambridge, Mass: MIT Press. 
Postal, Paul M. (2003). "Policing the Content of Linguistic Examples". Language. 79 (1), 182-188.
Postal, Paul M. Skeptical linguistic essays (Oxford University Press, USA, 2004).

References

External links
 Paul M. Postal homepage(NYU) 
 Noam Chomsky and the Quest for Social Justice, criticism of Chomsky by Postal

1936 births
Living people
Linguists from the United States
Syntacticians
New York University faculty